"Fallen Angel" is the second single from Open Up and Say...Ahh!, American glam metal band Poison's second studio album. The B-side of the seven inch was "Bad to Be Good".

Background
Released as a single in 1988 on Capitol Records, the track reached #12 on the Billboard Hot 100 and #32 on the Mainstream rock charts and has since gone Gold in the US. This made it the only single from the album not to reach the Top Ten. It also charted at number 21 on the Australian charts and number 59 on the UK Singles chart.

The song is about a young girl who grew up in a small town and goes to Los Angeles to try to make it as an actress. While there, she abandons her old life.

This theme is a reference to the history of the band Poison itself: Bret Michaels, Bobby Dall and Rikki Rockett all left their native Pennsylvania for Los Angeles in their quest for fame.

Cash Box said that "once again the boys bash and thrash their way through a good tune about the small-town girl gone bad in the big city."

"Fallen Angel", along with "Talk Dirty to Me," "I Won't Forget You" and "Ride the Wind," was the subject of a lawsuit in 2011 by members of the defunct band Kid Rocker, who claimed that the songs were based on Kid Rocker songs played to Poison guitarist C.C. DeVille before he was a member of Poison.  On April 8, 2013, a California federal judge said that the plaintiffs waited too long to file their lawsuit, stating, "It is totally implausible that plaintiff did not discover the alleged infringement until 2011."  The judge ruled that the plaintiffs could only sue for damages dating back three years from the date of the lawsuit (following a three-year statute of limitations), and no more.

Music video
The music video to "Fallen Angel" mostly follows the lyrics to the song, and was in heavy rotation on MTV. In the video, a young blonde (portrayed by Bret's then-girlfriend, model and then aspiring singer/actress Susie Hatton) tells her family, at dinner, that she is leaving for California at the end of the week, a statement that surprises and silences them. She arrives in Los Angeles with a suitcase in tow, eventually catching the attention of a sleazy manager (played by Anthony James). She becomes a success as a lingerie model, but feels like she is selling out her morals for fame. She begins dating her manager, but when he starts getting friendly with other ladies at a club, she leaves. He tries to get her back, but the girl gives him a kick in the groin and walks off. She is back on the streets, but is picked up by Bret Michaels on a Harley-Davidson Softail on Hollywood Boulevard and rides off into an unknown future. As her story ends, another girl, played by Michelle Davis, arrives on the bus hoping to find fame and fortune...

Rikki Rocket's white tee-shirt was blurred in several scenes, as it contained the Vision Street Wear logo, a popular brand with skate-boarders; Rikki was an avid skate-boarder. Two other logos, one being on a store window and another being a bus logo were also blurred as well perhaps for product brand issues.

Reception 
"Fallen Angel" is widely regarded as one of Poison's best songs. In 2017, Billboard and OC Weekly each ranked the song number seven on their lists of the 10 greatest Poison songs.

Albums
"Fallen Angel" is included on the following albums:

 Open Up and Say... Ahh!
 Swallow This Live (live version)
 Poison's Greatest Hits: 1986-1996
 Power to the People (live version)
 Show Me Your Hits - (Alternate version)
 The Best of Poison: 20 Years of Rock
 Open Up and Say...Ahh! - 20th Anniversary Edition
 Live, Raw & Uncut (live version)

Charts

Cover versions
Punk rockers MxPx released a cover of the song on their 2009 album On the Cover II. Their version featured guest appearances by Craig Owens of Chiodos and Stephen Egerton of Descendents.

References

1988 singles
Songs written by Bobby Dall
Songs written by Bret Michaels
Songs written by Rikki Rockett
Songs written by C.C. DeVille
Poison (American band) songs
Song recordings produced by Tom Werman
1988 songs
Enigma Records singles
Capitol Records singles